Snodland Town F.C. is an English football club based in Snodland, Kent. They play in the Southern Counties East League Division One, at level 10 of the English football league system. The club is affiliated to the Kent County Football Association.

History
The club was founded in 1948 as a boys team and known as Snodland Minors. The 1956–57 season saw the club enter a men's team into the Division 3B of the Maidstone and District Football League and winning it at the first attempt. The club then won the next division the following season and the Premier Division two seasons later. The 1963–64 season saw the club move to the Rochester league, but after 5 seasons they moved back to the Maidstone and District Football League. They stayed in the Maidstone and district league until the end of the 1991–92 season during which time they won the league twice, before moving to the Kent County League.

The 1994–95 season saw club finished as runners up in Division 3 West of the Kent County league and gain promotion to Division two west, and immediately winning division two east with their first attempt. Two seasons later the club won Division one west of the league and a further two seasons followed with the club winning the Premier Division.

In 2012 the club changed its name from Snodland to Snodland Town when they merged with a local junior team called Snodland Nomads FC. The club remained in the Kent County Football League until the end of the 2015–16 season, when they joined the newly-formed Division One of the Southern Counties East League. The 2017–18 season then saw the club enter the FA Vase for the first time.

Ground
The club have played at the Potyns Sports Ground since 1986 
In 2016 the club with help from the Football Stadia Improvement Fund installed floodlights at the ground.

Honours

Kent County League 
Premier Division Champions (1) 1999-00
Division One West Champions (1) 1997–98
Division Two West Champions (1) 1995–96
‘Bill Manklow’ Inter Regional Challenge Cup Winners (1) 2000–01
Maidstone and District Football League 
 Premier Division champions (2) 1959–60, 1983–84
 Division One Champions (1) 1973–74
 Division Two A champions (1) 1957–58
 Division Three B champions (1) 1956–57
Challenge Cup “B” Winners (1) 1957–58
Challenge Cup “A” Winners (1) 1983–84
Rochester and District Football League 
Quarter Century Cup Winners (1) 1963–64
Kent Junior Cup “A”
Winners (1) 1961–62
Sittingbourne and Milton Charity Cup
Winners (1) 1983–84

References

External links

Football clubs in Kent
Sport in Kent
Association football clubs established in 1948
1948 establishments in England
Football clubs in England
Snodland